Dalisson de Almeida Leite (born 6 April 2000), known as Dalisson or Dali, is a Brazilian professional footballer who plays as a right winger for Spanish club Rayo Cantabria.

Club career
Born in Maceió, Alagoas but raised in Cabezón de la Sal, Cantabria, Dalisson joined Real Valladolid's youth setup in 2015, from SD Textil Escudo. He made his senior debut with the reserves on 13 January 2019, coming on as a late substitute in a 1–0 Segunda División B away loss against UD San Sebastián de los Reyes.

On 28 August 2019, after finishing his formation, Dalisson was loaned to Tercera División side UM Escobedo. Upon returning, he was initially assigned to farm team Atlético Tordesillas, but only featured once before returning to Valladolid's B-team; on 17 December 2020, he renewed his contract until 2022.

On 6 July 2022, free agent Dalisson signed for Racing de Santander, being initially assigned to the B-side in Segunda Federación. He made his first team – and professional – debut on 1 November, replacing Iñigo Vicente in a 1–1 home draw against Deportivo Alavés in the Segunda División.

References

External links

2000 births
Living people
People from Maceió
Brazilian footballers
Footballers from Cantabria
Association football wingers
Segunda División players
Primera Federación players
Segunda Federación players
Segunda División B players
Tercera División players
Real Valladolid Promesas players
Rayo Cantabria players
Racing de Santander players